Danshuichi is a station on Line 1 of Wuhan Metro, opened upon  completion of Line 1, Phase 2 on July 29, 2010.  It is an elevated station at the intersection of Jiefang Avenue and Handi Road. The name "Danshuichi" is derived from the dialectical pronunciation of "Duanshuichi" (端水吃, literally "Grab water to drink"). There are two side platforms and two tracks at Danshuichi.

Station layout

Facilities

Danshuichi Station is a three-story elevated station built entirely along Jiefang Avenue. The station is equipped with attended customer service concierges, automatic ticket vending machines, accessible lifts, and restrooms in the fared zone.

Exits

There are currently four exits in service.

Exit A: Jiefang Avenue
Exit B: Jiefang Avenue. Accessible to Danshuichi Elementary School.
Exit C: Jiefang Avenue. Accessible to Baibuting Community.
Exit D: Jiefang Avenue

Transfers

Bus transfers to Route 3, 4, 211, 212, 232, 234, 301, 509, 577, 615, 717, 727, 809 are available at Danshuichi Station.

References

Wuhan Metro stations
Line 1, Wuhan Metro
Railway stations in China opened in 2010